Love for Love is a Restoration comedy written by British playwright William Congreve. It premiered on 30 April 1695 at the  Lincoln's Inn Fields Theatre. Staged by Thomas Betterton's company the original cast included Betterton as Valentine, William Smith as Scandal, John Bowman as Tattle, Thomas Doggett as Ben, Samuel Sandford as Foresight, William Bowen as Jeremy, John Freeman as Buckram, Anne Bracegirdle as Angelica, Elizabeth Bowman as Mrs Foresight, Elizabeth Barry as Mrs Frail, Elinor Leigh as Nurse and Abigail Lawson as Jenny.

Characters
The play is a comical farce enlivened by its witty dialogue and its humorous characters, and perhaps more successful in its day than The Way of the World, now considered Congreve's best. The main character is Valentine, then Jeremy, Valentine's resourceful servant; Sir Sampson, with his 'blunt vivacity'; Ben, the rough young sea-dog, who intends to marry whom he chooses; Miss Prue, only too ready to learn the lessons in love given her by Tattle, the vain, half-witted beau, who finds himself married to Mrs. Frail, the lady of easy virtue, when he thinks he has captured Angelica; and Foresight, the gullible old astrologer.

Dramatis Personae
Sir Sampson Legend, father to Valentine and Ben
Valentine, fallen under his father's displeasure by his expensive way of living, in love with Angelica
Scandal, his friend, a free speaker
Tattle, a half-witted beau, vain of his amours, yet valuing himself for secrecy
Ben, Sir Sampson's younger son, half home-bred and half sea-bred, designed to marry Miss Prue
Foresight, an illiterate old fellow, peevish and positive, superstitious, and pretending to understand astrology, palmistry, physiognomy, omens, dreams, etc., uncle to Angelica
Jeremy, servant to Valentine
Trapland, a scrivener
Buckram, a lawyer
Angelica, niece to Foresight, of a considerable fortune in her own hands
Mrs. Foresight, second wife to Foresight
Mrs. Frail, sister to Mrs. Foresight, a woman of the town
Miss Prue, daughter to Foresight by a former wife, a silly, awkward country girl
Nurse, to Miss Prue
Jenny, maid to Angelica
A Steward, Officers, Sailors, and several servants

Plot
Valentine has fallen under the displeasure of his father by his extravagance, and is besieged by creditors. His father, Sir Sampson Legend, offers him £4000 (only enough to pay his debts) if he will sign a bond engaging to make over his right to his inheritance to his younger brother Ben. Valentine, to escape from his embarrassment, signs the bond. He is in love with Angelica, who possesses a fortune of her own, but so far she has not yielded to his suit. Sir Sampson has arranged a match between Ben, who is at sea, and Miss Prue, an awkward country girl, the daughter of Foresight, a superstitious old fool who claims to be an astrologer. Valentine, realizing the ruin entailed by the signature of the bond, tries to move his father by submission, and fails; then pretends to be mad and unable to sign the final deed of conveyance to his brother. Finally Angelica intervenes. She induces Sir Sampson to propose marriage to her, pretends to accept, and gets possession of Valentine's bond. When Valentine, in despair at finding that Angelica is about to marry his father, declares himself ready to sign the conveyance, she reveals the plot, tears up the bond, and declares her love for Valentine.

References
Notes

Bibliography
Congreve, William (2000). Love for Love. London, England: A & C Black Limited.
Salgado, Gamini Three Restoration Comedies: The Man of Mode, The Country Wife, Love for love, Penguin Classics (2005).
Erskine-Hill, H., Lindsay, A. (eds), William Congreve: The Critical Heritage, Routledge (1995).

External links

 .
 
 Scene from Love for Love
 

1695 plays
Restoration comedy
Plays by William Congreve
Plays set in the 17th century